Melhania parviflora is a plant in the family Malvaceae, native to East Africa.

Description
The flowers have yellow petals.

Distribution and habitat
Melhania parviflora is native to Ethiopia, Kenya, Somalia, Tanzania and Uganda.

References

parviflora
Flora of Ethiopia
Flora of Somalia
Flora of East Tropical Africa
Plants described in 1932